Geit Prants  (born 7 February 1982) is a retired Estonian women's footballer. She was a member of the Estonia women's national football team from 2000–2011, playing 22 matches.

References

External links
 
 Profile at UEFA
 Profile at FuPa

1982 births
Living people
Estonian women's footballers
Estonia women's international footballers
People from Rapla
Women's association football defenders
Women's association football midfielders